Kent Peterson is an American politician and a Republican member of the South Dakota House of Representatives representing District 19 since 2015. Peterson serves as the majority leader. He is a member of the joint legislative procedure, judiciary, legislative procedure, and state affairs committees.

References

21st-century American politicians
Living people
Republican Party members of the South Dakota House of Representatives
Place of birth missing (living people)
Year of birth missing (living people)